45 Years is a 2015 British romantic drama film directed and written by Andrew Haigh. The film is based on the short story "In Another Country" by David Constantine. The film premiered in the main competition section of the 65th Berlin International Film Festival. Charlotte Rampling won the Silver Bear for Best Actress and Tom Courtenay won the Silver Bear for Best Actor. At the 88th Academy Awards, Rampling received a nomination for Best Actress in a Leading Role.

It was selected to be screened in the Special Presentations section of the 2015 Toronto International Film Festival and also screened at the 2015 Telluride Festival. It was released in the United Kingdom on 28 August 2015. The film was released in the United States by Sundance Selects on 23 December 2015.

Plot
Five years after retirees Kate and Geoff Mercer had to cancel their 40th wedding anniversary because of his heart bypass surgery, the comfortably-off, childless Norfolk couple are preparing to celebrate their 45th anniversary with dozens of friends at the Assembly House in Norwich. Their morning is somewhat disturbed when Geoff opens a letter telling him that the body of Katya, his German lover in the early 1960s, has become visible in a melting glacier where she fell into a crevasse on their hike in Switzerland over five decades ago.

Kate has been told about Katya previously by Geoff and seems initially unconcerned by his controlled disquiet. Geoff tells Kate that he and Katya had pretended to be married in order to be able to share a room in the more puritanical early 1960s. Because of this, the Swiss authorities consider him to be Katya's next of kin.

As the days pass and preparations for the party continue, Geoff continues to be moody and starts smoking again. One night, Geoff climbs into the attic to look at his memorabilia of Katya and only reluctantly shows a picture of her to an angrily insistent Kate. Kate notices that Katya appears to look much like Kate did when she was young, with similar dark hair.

While Geoff is out at a reunion luncheon at his former workplace, Kate climbs the ladder to the attic. She finds Geoff's scrapbook filled with memorabilia from his time with Katya, including pressed violets from their last hike. She finds a carousel slide projector, loaded with images of Switzerland and Katya, next to a makeshift screen to view them. Kate is shocked to see slides showing that Katya was pregnant at the time of her death.

Kate also takes up smoking again and, upon learning of his visit to the local travel agency to inquire about trips to Switzerland, confronts Geoff about his recent behavior related to Katya, without revealing what she saw in the attic. She says that she now believes that many of their decisions as a couple were influenced by Katya. Geoff promises that their marriage will "start again", which the next morning he marks by serving her tea in bed and making breakfast for her. They attend their anniversary party in the historic Grand Hall. Geoff delivers a tearful speech in which he professes his love for Kate.

The first dance is announced, accompanied by the same first song from their wedding, "Smoke Gets in Your Eyes" by The Platters. As Geoff and Kate slow dance, she becomes increasingly awkward and rigid, while he becomes silly and playful. As the song ends, Geoff raises their hands together in the air as the party guests cheer, but Kate yanks her arm down. Geoff, apparently oblivious, dances away. Kate stands alone amid the mass of people on the dance floor.

Cast
 Charlotte Rampling as Kate Mercer
 Tom Courtenay as Geoff Mercer
 Geraldine James as Lena
 Dolly Wells as Sally
 David Sibley as George
 Sam Alexander as Chris the Postman
 Richard Cunningham as Mr. Watkins
 Kevin Matadeen as the Waiter
 Hannah Chalmers as the Travel Agent
 Max Rudd as the Maître d'

Production 
Filming lasted over 6 weeks and concluded in May 2014.

Reception

Critical response
On review aggregator Rotten Tomatoes, the film has an approval rating of 97% based on 213 reviews, with an average rating of 8.6/10. The website's critical consensus reads, "45 Years offers richly thought-provoking rewards for fans of adult cinema – and a mesmerizing acting showcase for leads Charlotte Rampling and Tom Courtenay." On Metacritic, the film has a weighted average score of 94 out of 100, based on 36 critics, indicating "universal acclaim."

Mark Kermode described the film as a "subtle examination of the persistence of the past and the fragile (in)stability of the present" in The Observer, arguing that the lead performances "turn an apparently everyday story of a marriage in quiet crisis into something rather extraordinary." He concludes the review by observing "Like the final shot of The Long Good Friday, which lingers upon Bob Hoskins’s face as he revisits the events that brought him to this sorry pass, 45 Years shows us the past materialising in the expressions of those trapped in the present, staring into an uncertain future."

Accolades

References

External links
 
 
 
 
45 Years: Fissures an essay by Ella Taylor at the Criterion Collection
 See also: The Crystal Trench, a 1959 episode of Alfred Hitchcock Presents.

2015 films
2015 independent films
2015 romantic drama films
2010s English-language films
British romantic drama films
Films based on short fiction
Films directed by Andrew Haigh
Films set in Norfolk
Films shot in Norfolk
Film4 Productions films
British Film Institute films
IFC Films films
Curzon Artificial Eye films
2010s British films